Kenseth is a surname. Notable people with the surname include:

 Matt Kenseth (born 1972), American racing driver
 Ross Kenseth (born 1993), American racing driver, son of Matt

See also
 Kenneth
 Kensett (disambiguation)
 Kensit